Thomas Somerset or Pophull (fl. 1379–1393, died between 1396 and 1399) was an English politician and draper.

Family
Somerset lived in St. Martin's parish, near Carfax, Oxford, with his wife, Helen, and their one son. Helen died in 1399. Somerset was last recorded in 1396. There is no record of their son after their deaths.

Career
He was a Member (MP) of the Parliament of England for Oxford in 1379 and February 1388. He was Mayor of Oxford in 1392–93.

References

14th-century births
Year of death missing
English MPs 1379
English MPs February 1388
Mayors of Oxford